The Wonderful World of Mickey Mouse is an American animated streaming television series produced by Disney Television Animation for Disney+. The series is a continuation and revival of the Emmy Award-winning 2013 Mickey Mouse shorts, uses the same style, and has many of the same cast and crew, with the exception of the late Russi Taylor, who was replaced by Kaitlyn Robrock in the role of Minnie Mouse. The series premiered on November 18, 2020 to coincide with Mickey's 92nd birthday. The animation is provided by Mercury Filmworks.

From November 18 to December 18, 2020, Disney+ premiered two shorts a week. An additional ten shorts premiered from July 28 until August 25, 2021.

The series was renewed in November 2021 for four 22-minute specials centered around the seasons; the first of which, The Wonderful Winter of Mickey Mouse, premiered on February 18, 2022. The second special, The Wonderful Spring of Mickey Mouse, was released on March 25, 2022. The third special, The Wonderful Summer of Mickey Mouse, was released on July 8, 2022. The fourth and final special of the season, The Wonderful Autumn of Mickey Mouse, was released on November 18, 2022.

The series received generally positive reviews from critics.

Cast

Main voices
 Chris Diamantopoulos as Mickey Mouse, Bert
 Kaitlyn Robrock as Minnie Mouse
 Tony Anselmo as Donald Duck
 Bill Farmer as Goofy, Lumière
 Tress MacNeille as Daisy Duck, the Wicked Witch

Additional voices
 Jim Cummings as Pete, Tigger
 Corey Burton as Ludwig von Drake 
 April Winchell as Clarabelle Cow 
 John Kassir as Scrooge McDuck
 Paul Rudish as Walrus Mayor, additional voices
 Fred Tatasciore as Humphrey the Bear, Yeti, additional voices
 Jeff Bennett as Mortimer Mouse, Ranger J. Audubon Woodlore

Guest stars
 Alan Tudyk as the House of Tomorrow
 Pat Carroll as Ursula
 Clancy Brown as The Big Bad Wolf
 Joanna Lumley as the Narrator (The Brave Little Squire)
 Jeffrey Ross as Lonesome Ghost
 Jason Mantzoukas as Huckster McBackstabber
 Grey DeLisle as The Fairy Godmother
 Joe Ochman as Jiminy Cricket
 Antonia Thomas as the Narrator (The Wonderful Winter of Mickey Mouse)
 Craig Robinson as Snowflake Boss
 Keith David as the Narrator (The Wonderful Spring of Mickey Mouse)

Cameos by other Disney characters and properties
 Humphrey the Bear
 Weasels, J. Thaddeus Toad, Ichabod Crane and Tilda from The Adventures of Ichabod and Mr. Toad
 Thumper and Friend Owl from Bambi
 Bambi himself also appears on the cover of a book.
 Steamboat Willie Riverboat (pictured)
 Skeleton from The Skeleton Dance
 Butch the Bulldog
 Merlin and Madame Mim from The Sword in the Stone
 Yen Sid and Madame Upanova from Fantasia
 Ursula and Flounder from The Little Mermaid
 The Beagle Boys
 Oswald the Lucky Rabbit (hole)
 The Beast, Mrs. Potts, Chip, and Lumière from Beauty and the Beast
 Dippy Dawg
 Dumbo and Timothy Q. Mouse from Dumbo
 Rhino Guards, Friar Tuck, Lady Kluck, Otto, Mother Rabbit, Skippy, Sir Hiss and Trigger from Robin Hood
 Snow White, the Evil Queen (in her hag form), the Magic Mirror, Dopey, and the forest animals from Snow White and the Seven Dwarfs
 Aracuan Bird from The Three Caballeros 
 Flit from Pocahontas
 Cinderella from the film of the same name
 Alice and The Cheshire Cat from Alice in Wonderland
 Buff, Max, and Melvin from Country Bear Jamboree
 Jenny and Joe from Once Upon a Wintertime
 Tigger from the Winnie the Pooh franchise
 The Chimney Sweeps and Mary Poppins’s umbrella from Mary Poppins
 Susie the Little Blue Coupe from the titular cartoon

Music
Like in the previous series, the music was composed by Christopher Willis. Walt Disney Records released two soundtrack songs on a short album called The Wonderful World of Mickey Mouse, co-written by Willis: "Donald's Conga Song" from "Supermarket Scramble" and "The Wrangler's Code" from "Cheese Wranglers" in November 2020. 

Four more soundtrack songs were released under the title Music from The Wonderful World of Mickey Mouse, including "As Long As I Have You," "Island Rhythm," "Bubble Gum Days," and "Feelin' the Love."

Episodes

Season 1 (2020–21)

Season 2 (2022)

Reception

Critical reception 
Patrick Cavanaugh of ComicBook.com gave the series a positive review, describing it as "nothing but fun and excitement [...] filled with laugh-out-loud comedy, modern settings, timeless stories, new music, and the unmistakable classic art style of the Mickey Mouse shorts." Ethan Anderton of SlashFilm called both the creation of Mickey Mouse and The Wonderful World of Mickey Mouse the "best thing Disney has done with the trademark character outside of the theme parks in a long time," praised the animation for its style that recalls old animated shorts, and complimented the humor of the two shows, writing, "Not only is the animation outstanding, but it's pretty funny too." FP Staff of Firstpost reviewed the series positively, saying it holds "nostalgic value as old characters revisit," called the animation "whimsical," and found the show entertaining. Emily Ashby of Common Sense Media rated the show 3 out of 5 stars, found agreeable the depiction of positive role models, citing the friendship between characters, and praised the humor of the series, writing, "This show focuses on presenting stories that are fun and funny. [...] Some episodes involve mild stereotypes based on the characters’ roles and the story’s setting, but they’re always meant to be funny."

Accolades

References

External links
 
 
 

2020s American animated television series
2020s American anthology television series
2020s American children's comedy television series
2020 American television series debuts
American children's animated anthology television series
American children's animated comedy television series
American sequel television series
Crossover animated television series
Disney+ original programming
English-language television shows
Mickey Mouse television series
Television series by Disney Television Animation
Television series created by Paul Rudish